The Romanian Ecologist Party (PER) is a formerly ecologist and currently mostly conservative and green conservative political party in Romania. Without parliamentary representation, it is one of the microparties still active in the country with some representatives elected in the local administration (i.e. a few mayors and county councillors and 210 local councillors), especially in Râmnicu Vâlcea and Vâlcea County, where it is ranked third behing the National Liberal Party (PNL) and the Social Democratic Party (PSD), Romania's two largest parties. Previously, it collaborated with the Green Party (PV) in the 2008 legislative elections.

History 

The party was founded by Adrian Manolache, an engineer, in January 1990 as a political organisation opposed to the National Salvation Front (FSN). Adrian Manolache launched the program and the platform of the PER on 5 January 1990 in the newspaper Libertatea, being one of the newly founded parties in Romania and the second post-1989 registered one after the Christian Democratic National Peasants' Party (PNȚ-CD).

This party opposed the politics of the FSN from a very early stage and entered in an alliance with Radu Câmpeanu's National Liberal Party (PNL) in April, 1990, also supporting the Timișoara Proclamation which demanded that the former structures and members of the Romanian Communist Party should not get involved again in post-revolutionary politics.

The PER participated in the Romanian legislative election held in May 1990, winning one senator seat as well as eight deputy seats. The first (and also founding) president of the party was Adrian Manolache, but the first party congress which was held in April 1990 elected Otto Weber as president until 2001, when he was followed by Cornel Protopopescu until 2007, the latter being subsequently replaced by Dănuț Pop.

Notable members 

 Viorica Edelhauser, former deputy (between 1990 and 1992);
 Cornel Protopopescu, former deputy (between 1990 and 2000);
 Otto Ernest Weber, second president of the party;
 Gheorghe Toma, former mayor of the city of Suceava, Suceava County, Bukovina.

Leadership

Electoral history

Legislative elections

Presidential elections

European elections

See also 

Green party
Green Party (Romania)
Green politics
List of environmental organizations

References

External links
PER blog

1990 establishments in Romania
Right-wing parties in Romania
Green liberalism
Green political parties in Romania
Liberal parties in Romania
Political parties established in 1990
Registered political parties in Romania
Green conservative parties
Eurosceptic parties in Romania
Right-wing populist parties
Social conservative parties
Conservative parties in Romania